Assistant Professor is an academic rank just below the rank of an associate professor used in universities or colleges, mainly in the United States and Canada.

Overview
This position is generally taken after earning a doctoral degree and generally after several years of holding one or more Postdoctoral Researcher positions. It is below the position of Associate Professor at most universities and is equivalent to the rank of Lecturer at most Commonwealth universities.  In the United States, Assistant Professor is often the first position held in a tenure track, although it can also be a non-tenure track position. A typical professorship sequence is Assistant Professor, Associate Professor, and Full Professor in order. After 7 years, if successful, Assistant Professors can get tenure and also get promotion to Associate Professor.

There is high demand for vacant tenure-track Assistant Professor positions, often with hundreds of applicants. Less than 20% of doctoral graduates move onto a  tenure-track Assistant Professor position after graduation.

Comparison

The table presents a broad overview of the traditional main systems, but there are universities which use a combination of those systems or other titles. Some universities in Commonwealth countries have also entirely adopted the North American system in place of the Commonwealth system.

See also
 
 Academic ranks in Canada

References

Academic ranks
Assistance